Park Avenue Historic District is the name of several historic districts, including:

(by state)
Park Avenue Historic District (Denver, Colorado), a Denver Landmark
Park Avenue Historic District (Tallahassee, Florida), NRHP-listed
Park Avenue Historic District (Detroit), listed on the National Register of Historic Places (NRHP)
Park Avenue Apartment District, Omaha, Nebraska, NRHP-listed
Park Avenue Historic District (Manhattan), New York, New York, listed on the NRHP in Manhattan
Park Avenue Houses, New York, New York, NRHP-listed